N6946-BH1 is a disappearing giant star in another galaxy, NGC 6946, on the northern border of the constellation of Cygnus. The star, either a red supergiant or a yellow hypergiant, was 25 times the mass of the sun, and was 20 million light years distant from Earth.  In March through to May 2009 its bolometric luminosity increased to at least a million solar luminosities,  but by 2015 it had disappeared from optical view. In the mid and near infrared an object is still visible, however, it is fading away with a brightness proportional to t−4/3. The brightening was insufficient to be a supernova, and is called a failed supernova.

The star's coordinates were at RA  and Dec . The brightness of the star, given by its apparent magnitude in different colour bands on 2 July 2005 is given by R = 21, V = 21, B = 22, U = 23. Prior to the optical outburst the star was about 100,000 times as bright as the sun. After the outburst it was invisible in the visual band and has declined to 5000 times as bright as the sun in infrared radiation.

One hypothesis is that the core of the star collapsed to form a black hole. The collapsing matter formed a burst of neutrinos that lowered the total mass of the star by a fraction of a percent. This caused a shock wave that blasted out the star's envelope to make it brighter. N6946-BH1 has supplied evidence contrary to the conventional idea that black holes are usually formed after a supernova, suggesting instead that a star may bypass this eventuality and yet collapse into a black hole.

The expectation is that something else is happening to these extra large stars. Failed supernovae and black hole formation is one proposed explanation. If this event indeed reflected the formation of a black hole, it is the first time that black hole formation has been observed.

Notes

References

External links
 N6946-BH1 Giant Star Becomes A Black Hole Right Before Our Eyes!

Stars in NGC 6946
M-type supergiants
Astronomical objects discovered in 2015
Cygnus (constellation)
Extragalactic stars